Maciejowski (feminine:Maciejowska) is a Polish surname derived from any of geographical locations derived from the given name Macjej (Maciejów, Maciejówka, etc.).

It may refer to:
 Bernard Maciejowski, 17th-century Bishop of Krakow and Primate of Poland.
  (1835-1901) a Polish writer.
 Jan Maciejowski, a British electrical engineer.
  (born 1974, Babice), a Polish painter.
 Samuel Maciejowski, 16th-century Bishop of Krakow.
 Wacław (Aleksander) Maciejowski (1793–1883), Polish historian.
 Michał Maciejowski, Polish fighter ace.

 Zofia Czeska (Zofia Czeska-Maciejowska)

See also 
 Maciejowski Bible
 Ruda Maciejowska, a village in the administrative district
Maciejewski (surname)

References

Polish-language surnames
Polish toponymic surnames